Boana cipoensis is a species of frog in the family Hylidae that is endemic to Brazil.
Its natural habitats are subtropical or tropical moist montane forests, dry savanna, moist savanna, rivers, and intermittent rivers.
It is threatened by habitat loss.

References

Sources

Boana
Endemic fauna of Brazil
Taxonomy articles created by Polbot
Amphibians described in 1968